The Chinese Ambassador to Tonga is the official representative of the People's Republic of China to the Kingdom of Tonga.

List of representatives

See also
China–Tonga relations

References

Tonga
China